Charisma (also known as Charisma + Christian Life) is a monthly Christian magazine based in Lake Mary, Florida, a suburb of Orlando.  It is aimed at Pentecostals and charismatics. Its perspective is influenced by the charismatic revivalism and other contemporary streams of charismatic Christianity such as the Toronto Blessing, International House of Prayer, and the Apostolic-Prophetic movement.

History
The magazine was founded in 1975 as the members' magazine of Calvary Assembly of God in Winter Park, Florida, with Stephen Strang as publisher.  In 1981, Strang bought the magazine for $25,000 and broadened its mission to serve the charismatic movement at large. The first year proved to be difficult, with a $100,000 loss, but the magazine later emerged as the "main magazine of the Christian charismatic movement".  Strang continues to run the magazine today through his company, Charisma Media (formerly Strang Communications).

In 1986, Charisma merged with Robert Walker's Christian Life magazine, which had been established in 1948, and Christian Life moved from Du Page County to Charisma's base in Altamonte Springs, Florida. The merger, after which Walker served as a mentor to Strang, was described "a step towards bridging the gap between evangelical and charismatic Christians." Charisma became Charisma + Christian Life, and served as the flagship for Strang's organization. The magazine continued to grow over the subsequent years, and by 1997 it had a circulation of 250,000. With the growth of the magazine and Strang Communications, Strang's influence grew as well, to the point where he was listed by Time in 2005 as one of "The 25 Most Influential Evangelicals in America".

The content of the magazine is a mixture of news, interviews, "Christian living" features, Bible teaching, and essays by columnists. Regular columnists include Joyce Meyer and Don Colbert.

Notable reporting

In November 2019, Charisma’s affiliated website, Charisma News, published a report by Taylor Berglund that detailed sexual harassment allegations by multiple women against Christian comedian John Crist. Berglund’s report was picked up and confirmed by The Washington Post, People and Christianity Today. In publishing, Charisma News made the unusual decision to withhold the identities of its sources and included a lengthy explanation of its rationale for reporting: "To be candid, our editorial team does not relish being in this position. We sifted through and gathered information for months before deciding to move forward with the story. Though the allegations against Crist are not criminal, we believe they are newsworthy for three reasons. We believe pastors and leaders who book Crist at their ministry events need to know the person they're signing. We believe leaders who make Christianity part of their public persona—whether or not they are formally in ministry—should be held to a higher standard. And above all, we believe the body of Christ must police itself and has an obligation to protect the innocent and vulnerable among us."

Berglund later told Slate magazine: "There’s an unfortunately large group of believers who tend to instinctively side with the perpetrator and shame or harass the victims online. We decided we wanted to avoid that, and would stake our own outlet’s credibility and reputation on the fact that we believed the women. If anyone was mad about reporting on the allegations, they could be mad at Charisma, not at the individual women who bravely spoke out."

Following the report, Netflix postponed the release of Crist's comedy special, and Christian publisher WaterBrook indefinitely delayed the release of his book.

Controversy

Charisma News has drawn criticism for politically charged articles. One article called for violence against Arabs and Muslims on biblical grounds, and was taken down after criticism. Another article claimed that Democratic presidential candidate Pete Buttigieg is “deserving of death” for being gay.

Publishing 
Charisma House, a sister to Charisma magazine, publishes books by authors such as Jonathan Cahn (under the Frontline imprint), Jentezen Franklin, John Bevere,  Don Colbert, and John Eckhardt.

References

External links
 Charisma magazine

Monthly magazines published in the United States
Charismatic and Pentecostal Christianity
Evangelical magazines
Magazines established in 1975
Magazines published in Florida